The Una River is a river of Pernambuco state in northeastern Brazil. The Una originates on the Borborema Plateau, flows east, and empties into the Atlantic Ocean near Barreiros. Its length is 290 km, and its basin area is 6,740 km2, of which 6,263 km2 in Pernambuco. It flows through the towns São Bento do Una, Altinho, Palmares and Agua Preta.

See also
 List of rivers of Pernambuco

References

Rivers of Pernambuco